Bolshoy Kamen (lit. large stone) is a town in the south of Primorsky Krai, Russia, located on the opposite side of the Ussuri Bay as seen from Lazurnaya Bay. The town was closed due to its naval base and the Zvezda shipyard, but this status was revoked as from 1 January 2015. Population: 
Famous world champion in speedway Artem Laguta lives in Bolshoj Kamen.

History
Bolshoy Kamen began as a naval support base in 1947 and was granted urban-type settlement status in 1956, followed by town status on 31 August 1989. During the Soviet era, the town's nature as a naval base saw it designated as closed. This status was revoked in 1989, with plans for a civilian harbor in the town; however, these plans were later cancelled and the town was closed again in 1996. As of 1 January 2015 the closed status was once again revoked.

Administrative and municipal status
Within the framework of administrative divisions, it is, together with two rural localities, incorporated as Bolshoy Kamen Town Under Krai Jurisdiction—an administrative unit with the status equal to that of the districts. As a municipal division, Bolshoy Kamen Town Under Krai Jurisdiction is incorporated as Bolshoy Kamen Urban Okrug.

Economy
Bolshoy Kamen is a monotown mostly specialized in engineering. Shipbuilding and repair works together with food industry and construction constitutes the basis of its economy. A large proportion of the town's population left during the 1990s, as the ship repair facilities operated almost at a standstill after the dissolution of the Soviet Union.

Most of the town's population is employed in the repair and construction of nuclear submarines. There are three banks and seven joint-venture companies, specializing in ships, shipping, and sea-fishing.

The town is connected with Vladivostok by road and by railway and is connected by a goods rail line to the Trans-Siberian Railway.

There are plans to expand and redevelop the Zvezda shipyard.

Climate

References

Sources

External links
Official website of Bolshoy_Kamen 
Bolshoy_Kamen Business Directory 

Cities and towns in Primorsky Krai
Russian and Soviet Navy bases